A travois (Canadian French, from French , a frame for restraining horses; also obsolete travoy or travoise) is a historical frame structure that was used by indigenous peoples, notably the Plains Aboriginals of North America, to drag loads over land.

There is evidence to support the thesis that travois were used in other parts of the world before the invention of the wheel.

Construction and use 

The basic construction consists of a platform or netting mounted on two long poles, lashed in the shape of an elongated isosceles triangle; the frame was dragged with the sharply pointed end forward. Sometimes the blunt end of the frame was stabilized by a third pole bound across the two poles.

The travois was dragged by hand, sometimes fitted with a shoulder harness for more efficient dragging, or dragged by dogs or horses (after the 16th-century introduction of horses by the Spanish).

A travois could either be loaded by piling goods atop the bare frame and tying them in place, or by first stretching cloth or leather over the frame to hold the load to be dragged.

Although considered more primitive than wheel-based forms of transport, on the type of territory where the travois was used (forest floors, soft soil, snow, etc.), rather than roadways, wheels would have encountered difficulties which would have made them less efficient. As such the travois was employed by coureurs des bois in New France's fur trade with the Plains Tribes.

It is possible for a person to transport more weight on a travois than can be carried on the back.

Dog travois 

The basic dog travois consists of two aspen or cottonwood poles notched and lashed together at one end with buffalo sinew; the other ends rest splayed apart. Cross-bars are lashed between the poles near the splayed ends, and the finished frame looks like a large letter A with extra cross-bars. The apex of the A, wrapped in buffalo skin to prevent friction burns, rests on a dog's shoulders, while the splayed ends drag over the ground ... First Nations women both built the travois and managed the dogs, sometimes using toy travois to train the puppies. Buffalo meat and firewood were typical travois loads. 
According to The Canadian Encyclopedia, "The dog travois of pre-European times was small, capable of pulling not more than 20 to 30 kg." Travel by dog travois was slower in hot weather, which is tiring for dogs. The dog travois can be seen in the paintings of Karl Bodmer.

Horse travois 
By the mid-18th century, the dog travois had given way to the horse travois. According to The Canadian Encyclopedia, "When dogs were replaced by horses, the greater pulling power allowed tipis to increase in size and household goods to multiply." The Native Languages of the Americas website relates that:

After horses were introduced to North America, many Plains Indian tribes began to make larger horse-drawn travois. Instead of making specially constructed travois sleds, they would simply cross a pair of tepee poles across the horse's back and attach a burden platform between the poles behind the horse. This served two purposes at once, as the horses could then simultaneously carry the tepee poles and some additional baggage. Horses, of course, could pull much greater weight than dogs. Children often rode in the back of horse travois.

When traveling with a travois, it was traditional for Salish people to leave the tipi poles  behind at the camp "for use by the next tribe or family to camp there."

A horse travois can be made with either A-frame or H-frame construction.

Other ways to use a travois
The travois served the Native Americans in a number of ingenious ways. Before the use of horses, Blackfoot women made a curved fence of dog travois’ tied together, front end up, to hold driven animals enclosed until the hunters could kill them. When the women put up a tipi, they placed an upright horse travois against a tipi pole and used it as a ladder so they could attach the two upper sides of the lodge cover with wooden pins. A travois leaned against a branch of a tree functioned as a simple burial scaffold for a dead Crow baby tied to it.

Travois tracks 
What today is known as the Lewis and Clark Trail-Travois Road, and Montana's Lewis and Clark Pass were areas heavily traveled where travois  "were dragged over the trail, causing deep, parallel tracks to mark the earth," which are still visible today. Remains of travois tracks can also be seen at the Knife River Indian Villages National Historic Site.

See also 

Lewis and Clark Trail-Travois Road
Carrying pole
Sled

Notes

External links 
Dog Travois Plans
Travois photos, A Song for the Horse Nation, National Museum of the American Indian
Horse-Drawn travois , at Crow Fair
Atsina Indian on horse pulling travois, photograph by Edward S. Curtis
Travois photographs, from Denver Public Library

Native American tools
Indigenous culture of the Great Plains
Human-powered vehicles
Animal-powered vehicles